Song from the Street was the debut album of Canadian singer-songwriter Murray McLauchlan, released in 1971. This album is only the fourth release by fledgling Canadian label True North Records, and McLauchlan its second Singer-Songwriter artist joining Bruce Cockburn (True North had also released a record by electronic group Syrinx before Song from the Street).

The album title is echoed in Murray McLauchlan's compilation release thirty-six years later, which was titled Best of Murray McLauchlan: Songs from the Street.

Track listing 
All tracks composed by Murray McLauchlan
 "I Just Get Older" – 2:47	
 "You Make My Loneliness Fly" – 4:06
 "Sixteen Lanes of Highway" – 5:30
 "Jesus Please Don't Save Me ('Til I Die)" – 3:18
 "I Would Call You My Friend" – 3:32
 "One Night By My Window" – 3:43
 "Child's Song" – 6:24
 "Back on the Street" – 3:11
 "Honky Red" – 3:57
 "Ranchero's Lament" – 2:44

Personnel
Murray McLauchlan – vocals, guitar, harmonica, slide guitar
Barry Flast – piano
Eugene Martynec – guitar, producer
Dennis Pendrith – bass, backing vocals
Eric Robertson – organ
Jay Telfer – drums
Technical
Henry Saskowski - engineer
Bart Schoales - artwork, photography

1971 debut albums
Murray McLauchlan albums
True North Records albums